Christopher Hinton, Baron Hinton of Bankside  (12 May 190122 June 1983) was a British nuclear engineer, and supervisor of the construction of Calder Hall, the world's first large-scale commercial nuclear power station.

Career
Hinton was born on 12 May 1901 at Tisbury, Wiltshire. He attended school in Chippenham where his father was a schoolmaster, and left school at 16 to become an engineering apprentice with the Great Western Railway at Swindon. At 22 he was awarded the William Henry Allen scholarship of the Institution of Mechanical Engineers to Trinity College, Cambridge, where he graduated with a first class honours degree.

Hinton then worked for Brunner Mond, later part of ICI, where he became Chief Engineer at the age of 29. At Brunner Mond he met Lillian Boyer (d. 1973) whom he married in 1931. They had one daughter, Mary (1932–2014), who married Arthur Mole, son of Sir Charles Mole, director-general of the Ministry of Works.

During World War II, Hinton was seconded to the Ministry of Supply and became Deputy Director General, running ordnance factory construction and in charge of the Royal Filling Factories.

In 1946, Hinton was appointed Deputy Controller of Production, Atomic Energy, and in 1954 when the Atomic Energy Authority was formed, was appointed Member for Engineering and Production as managing director of 'Industrial Group Risley' which comprised the Risley headquarters and laboratories at Culcheth, Capenhurst, Windscale, Springfields and Dounreay plus factories at Springfields, Capenhurst, Windscale, Calder, Dounreay and Chapelcross. Hinton's department was responsible for the design and construction of most of Britain's major nuclear plants, including Windscale, Capenhurst, Springfields and Dounreay. 

In 1957, Hinton became the first chairman of the Central Electricity Generating Board (CEGB). He retired in 1964 but right up until the time of his death the CEGB kept an office for him at their headquarters in Paternoster Square. For his 80th birthday the Research Division gave a party at which a birthday cake was equipped with 80 candles. These were so closely spaced that when he lit the central candle, the flame spread rapidly to all of the others – Sir Christopher had initiated his last chain reaction!

In 1965 he worked for six months in the Ministry of Transport and afterwards became a special adviser to the World Bank. He served as Chairman of the International Executive Committee of the World Energy Conference, 1962–68.

He was created Baron Hinton of Bankside, of Dulwich in the County of London, a life peer, on 28 January 1965, and served as Chancellor of the University of Bath 1966 – 1979. He was appointed to the Order of Merit in 1976.

Hinton Heavies

The English architectural critic Reyner Banham dubbed the first 500MW units ordered by the CEGB as the Hinton Heavies. A first for 500MW power station design the stations are listed below in the order that the CEGB released them for construction.

The 500 MW standard unit design was subsequently slightly scaled up to 660 MW, using the same main and reheat steam conditions. These larger units were constructed from 1967 onwards at Drax, Grain and Littlebrook power stations. Similar 660 MW turbogenerators were also installed at all of Britain's AGR nuclear power stations, albeit with radically different steam-raising plant. The 660 MW units were the largest generating plant, and the last pure steam-cycle plant, ever constructed by the CEGB before its break-up and privatisation in the 1990s.

The Hinton Cup and Hinton Trophy
During his time at the Central Electricity Generating Board he commissioned the Hinton Cup, a piece of silverware that would be presented annually to the power station that displayed good housekeeping in the workplace. The citation to go with the cup reads 'This cup is presented to the Power Station judged to have reached the highest attainment in economy and efficiency of operation and maintenance with particular reference to attractiveness and good housekeeping'.

The cup was first won by Meaford A power station in 1959 and was last won by West Burton Power Station prior to the divestment of the Central Electricity Generating Board. The Hinton Trophy was the equivalent award for the best Transmission District. Because of the miners' strike there was no competition in 1984–85. To commemorate the thirty years of awarding the cup and trophy a presentation plate was manufactured by Gladstone Pottery Museum in Stoke-on-Trent.

Awards and achievements
 Knighted 1951
 Fellow of the Royal Society 1954
 Wilhelm Exner Medal, 1956
 Knight Commander of the Order of the British Empire, 1957
 Fellow of Trinity College, 1957
 Honorary Degree (DSc), University of Oxford 1957
 Honorary Degree (ScD), University of Cambridge 1960 
 On 28 January 1965 he was made a life peer as Baron Hinton of Bankside, of Dulwich in the County of London.
 President of the Institution of Mechanical Engineers, 1966
 Foreign Associate, National Academy of Engineering, 1976
 Order of Merit, 1976
 Honorary Degree (Doctor of Science), University of Bath, 1966
 Chancellor of the University of Bath 1966–80
 James Watt International Medal 1973
 First President of the Royal Academy of Engineering
 DRS Class 37 diesel locomotive 37409 named Lord Hinton at Crewe Gresty Bridge Depot Open Day, 10 July 2010
 Lord Hinton bulk carrier ship (completed 1986, broken up 2015)

References

External links
 Memorial Tributes, nap.edu; accessed 5 May 2017.
 Baron Christopher Hinton papers, aip.org; accessed 5 May 2017.
 Profile, raeng.org.uk; accessed 5 May 2017.
 Oxford DNB extract, oxforddnb.com; accessed 5 May 2017.
The Papers of Lord Hinton of Bankside, held at Churchill Archives Centre

British nuclear engineers
Fellows of the Royal Society
Fellows of the Royal Academy of Engineering
Presidents of the Royal Academy of Engineering
Alumni of Trinity College, Cambridge
Members of the Order of Merit
Hinton of Bankside 
Knights Commander of the Order of the British Empire
People from Tisbury, Wiltshire
People educated at Hardenhuish School
Chancellors of the University of Bath
1901 births
1983 deaths
People associated with the nuclear weapons programme of the United Kingdom
Foreign associates of the National Academy of Engineering
Life peers created by Elizabeth II